Gara is a 2019 Indian Kannada-language drama film directed by Murali Krishna and starring Rahman, Avantika and Pradeep Aryan. The story is based on R. K. Narayan's short story An Astrologer's Day.

Cast 
Rahman as Gangaswamy aka Nishant
Avantika as Akasmika 
 Pradeep Aryan as Bhageeratha 
Johnny Lever
Sadhu Kokila
Tabla Nani
MS Umesh

Production 
This film marks television news anchor Rehman Hassan's film debut. Johnny Lever made his Kannada debut with this film.

Soundtrack 
The songs were composed by Sagar and his father Gururaj. Manjula and Sangeetha Gururaj sang songs in the film.

Reception 
A critic from The Times of India opined that "What works for the film is it's visuals and the music. But the screen time ends up being far too long and, in hindsight, only makes the film seem like an intelligent exercise on paper". A critic from Bangalore Mirror wrote that "It may have been a good story on paper, but on screen, Gara is a haphazard plot that is far too long for its content, too slow to be engaging and poorly structured for an impact". A critic from Cinema Express stated that "The only positives in Gara are the picturesque locations, the cinematography by HC Venu, and Sagar Gururaj's music. Everything else gets a thumbs down".

References